Luís Feiteira (born 21 April 1973) is a Portuguese long-distance runner who specialises in marathon running.

Achievements

References
 

1973 births
Living people
Portuguese male marathon runners
Portuguese male long-distance runners
Portuguese male middle-distance runners
Athletes (track and field) at the 1996 Summer Olympics
Athletes (track and field) at the 2012 Summer Olympics
Olympic athletes of Portugal
Olympic male marathon runners